Peter Buell Porter (May 7, 1806 – 1871) was an American lawyer and politician from New York. He was Assemblyman and Speaker of the New York State Assembly in 1841.

Early life
Peter Buell Porter was born on May 7, 1806 in Salisbury, Connecticut, to Augustus Porter (1769–1849), and his second wife Jane Howell.  His uncle, and namesake, was Peter Buell Porter (1773–1844), the United States Secretary of War under John Quincy Adams.  Shortly after his birth in June 1806, Porter moved with his family to Niagara Falls, New York. He graduated from Hamilton College. Then he studied law, was admitted to the bar and practiced in Buffalo, New York.

Family life
Porter died in 1871.

Career
Elected as a Whig, Porter was a member from Niagara County of the New York State Assembly from January 1, 1838 to December 31, 1841, and was Speaker in 1841. In 1852, he was a vice president of the committee that organized the celebration of the anniversary of the Battle of Lundy's Lane, and was a director of the Buffalo and Niagara Falls Railroad.

References

External links
John Stilwell Jenkins: History of Political Parties in the State of New-York (Alden & Markham, Auburn NY, 1846)
 Committee for celebration of the Battle of Lundy's Lane, in NYT on July 13, 1852
The Papers of Henry Clay: The Whig Leader, January 1, 1837-December 31, 1843 by Henry Clay, Robert Seager II, Robert Seager, and Melba Porter Hay (University Press of Kentucky, 1988, page 474)

1806 births
1871 deaths
New York (state) Whigs
19th-century American politicians
Members of the New York State Assembly
Speakers of the New York State Assembly
People from Niagara County, New York
Hamilton College (New York) alumni
19th-century American railroad executives
People from Salisbury, Connecticut